Odd Fellows Temple may refer to:

in Canada
Odd Fellows Temple (Saskatoon), Listed as a historic property, located in Saskatoon, Saskatchewan

in the United States
 Odd Fellows Temple (Pasadena, California), listed on the NRHP in California
 Odd Fellows Temple (Lexington, Kentucky), listed on the NRHP in Kentucky
 Odd Fellows Temple (Waterville, Maine), listed on the NRHP in Maine
 Odd Fellows Temple (East Liverpool, Ohio), listed on the NRHP in Ohio

See also
List of Odd Fellows buildings
 Odd Fellows Hall (disambiguation)